Cake Financial was a free web-based financial services social network for individual investors allowing members to share their real stock portfolios and performance with other members. The site was introduced publicly on 17 September 2007, at the TechCrunch40 Conference, by Founder and CEO, Steven Carpenter.  The company also had a Cake Investment Club application on Facebook.
Cake had generated media coverage from a number of financial news outlets such as Forbes, Kiplinger, BusinessWeek and Barron's.
Cake was backed by Alsop Louie Partners, as well as from angel investors. The company was located in San Francisco, California.

As of 14 January 2010, the site discontinued operations and it was announced that it had been acquired by E*Trade.

References

Financial services companies established in 2006
Defunct social networking services
Companies based in San Francisco
Online financial services companies of the United States
American social networking websites
Internet properties established in 2006